Ho Chi Minh City metropolitan area is a metropolitan area that was in June 2008 proposed by the Ministry of Construction of Vietnam to the Government of Vietnam for approval. According to this master plan, this metropolitan area will include provinces around Ho Chi Minh City in the Southeast region and 2 provinces in the Mekong Delta region.

This metropolitan area currently has an area of 30,404 square kilometers with radius of 150–200 km, a population of 20–22 million inhabitants, of which urban residents account for 16–17 million, urbanized rate of 77–80%. By 2050, the population will have increased to 25-27 million people, and the urbanized rate is estimated to rise to 90%. Constructed land will be 1800–2100 square kilometer by 2020. Ho Chi Minh City will be the core urban center of the area while other surrounding cities and towns will play their role as satellite municipalities. Baria-Vungtau will serve as the main deepwater seaport of the region, especially Sao Mai-Ben Dinh seaport, Thi Vai Port. Long Thanh International Airport and Tan Son Nhat International Airport will serve as the air traffic hub of the region. Hi-tech park will be located in Ho Chi Minh City while other heavy industry will concentrate in Đồng Nai, Bình Dương and Bà Rịa–Vũng Tàu. Vũng Tàu will serve as tourism hub, with its beautiful beaches and several entertainment resort mega projects like a 4.2-billion-USD project invested by Canadian corporations, Cua Lap Resort, Disneyland-like theme park, Vung Tau Aquarium...

Component localities

This metropolitan area will straddle in following provinces: 
Ho Chi Minh City
Đồng Nai province
Bình Dương province
Bình Phước province
Bà Rịa–Vũng Tàu province
Tây Ninh province
Tiền Giang province
Long An province

Major cities

Additional cities which will be developed in a decade:
Bà Rịa–Vũng Tàu province
Long Điền town, upgraded from Long Điền District,
Đất Đỏ town, upgraded from Đất Đỏ District,
Đồng Nai province
Nhơn Trạch city, upgraded from Nhơn Trạch District,
Long Thành city, upgraded from Long Thành Township,
Long An province
Đức Hoà town, upgraded from Đức Hoà township, Hậu Nghĩa township and Hiệp Hòa township (Đức Hòa District),

Transportation

Air transport
As of 2008, Tan Son Nhat International Airport is the only airport in use with the designed capacity of 15-17 million passengers per annum. Long Thanh International Airport which located in Đồng Nai, 40 km northeast of Ho Chi Minh City constructed in 2010. This new airport will have full designed capacity of 80-100 million passengers annually. The estimated investment capital is US$8 billion and due to be completed in 2015 (phase I) and 2020 (phase II). Once the first phase is completed, this airport will be capable to serve 20 million passengers per year.

Ports
Most of the principal ports will concentrate in Ho Chi Minh City and Bà Rịa–Vũng Tàu. In 2007, all ports in Ho Chi Minh City alone handled 50.5 million metric tons of cargo.

Highway
National Highway 1 A, the core road in Vietnam crosses this region. Other expressways are under construction include: Long Thành-Dau Day-Da Lat Expressway, Saigon-Cần Thơ Expressway, Trans-Asian Highway, 3 belt ring expressways in Ho Chi Minh City, Biên Hòa-Vũng Tàu Expressway, Tân An-Biên Hòa Expressway.

Railway
Together with the trans-Vietnam railway development, Ho Chi Minh City-Nha Trang express railway will be built after 2010 to enable an average speed of 300 km/hour. Ho Chi Minh City Metro is currently under construction.

Education
This region is currently home to more than 40 universities and 40 colleges and hundreds of vocational schools.

Economy
Ho Chi Minh City will host the region's financial, commercial, hi-tech, educational, transportation and communication services. Vũng Tàu will be the seaside entertainment hub as well as petroleum center (oil and gas exploitation, oil refinery, LPG production), steel, fertilizer, electricity. Đồng Nai and Bình Dương will focus on electrical and electronic industry, food processing, machinery, textile, footwear, furniture.

See also
Hanoi Capital Region

References

Geography of Ho Chi Minh City
Metropolitan areas of Vietnam
Economic regions of Vietnam